Campustown may refer to:

 Campustown (Champaign, Illinois), a locality of Champaign, Illinois, United States
 a locality of Ames, Iowa, United States